Linwood Boomer (born October 9, 1955) is a Canadian-American television producer, writer, and former actor. He is known for playing the role of Adam Kendall on the drama Little House on the Prairie, and for creating the Fox sitcom Malcolm in the Middle.

Early life 

Boomer was born into a lower-middle class family in Vancouver, British Columbia, Canada, the third of four sons. He was enrolled in a gifted program at school. His mother is named Eileen. He was the middle child in his household. Boomer made a show based on his life story called Malcolm in the Middle, which ran on FOX from January 2000 to May 2006.

Career
Boomer began his career as an actor. After playing Adam Kendall on Little House on the Prairie, Boomer began working behind the camera in the television business.

Boomer's writing and executive producing credits include Night Court, Flying Blind, The Boys Are Back, Townies, 3rd Rock from the Sun and God, the Devil and Bob. He also created and executive produced the pilots Family Business, Nice Try, and the U.S. version of Red Dwarf, and served as an executive producer under James L. Brooks for the pilot of Big. He owns his own production company Satin City.

Boomer negotiated with CBS on a pilot order for a project that reunited him with Gail Berman, the exec who shepherded Malcolm during her tenure at Regency TV and as programming chief at Fox. Boomer wrote the script and exec produced along with Berman and Lloyd Braun for their BermanBraun shingle and Universal Media Studios, where BermanBraun is based. Dubbed The Karenskys, the multi-camera comedy would revolve around a daughter's return to the fold of her large, eccentric, ethnic family after her husband takes a job in her hometown. It was directed by Pamela Fryman and starred Annie Potts, Desi Lydic, Jack Thompson, Mather Zickel, Sasha Alexander, Tinsley Grimes, & Todd Stashwick.

Malcolm in the Middle

Boomer based the Fox sitcom Malcolm in the Middle on his life story. The pilot episode of the series premiered on January 9, 2000 and was watched by 22.5 million viewers, while the second episode, "Red Dress" (premiered on January 16, 2000), was watched by 26 million viewers. Boomer wrote two episodes, starting with the pilot episode and then "Francis Escapes" and directed five episodes --  "Opera," "Stilts," "Reese vs. Stevie," "Bride of Ida," and the series finale, "Graduation." Boomer received a Primetime Emmy Award for Outstanding Writing for a Comedy Series for the pilot episode. The series completed its six-year run on May 14, 2006, after seven seasons and 151 episodes.

Awards and nominations

Wins
 Primetime Emmy Award for Outstanding Writing in Comedy Series for Malcolm in the Middle ("Pilot")

Nominations
 Primetime Emmy Awards for Outstanding Comedy Series for Malcolm in the Middle (2001)
 Primetime Emmy Awards for Outstanding Comedy Series for Night Court (1984)

Filmography

References

External links 
 
 Hollywood Reporter Interview from February 2004
 Malcolm In The Middle Voting Community - Fan Site

1955 births
American male television actors
American television directors
American television writers
American male television writers
American television producers
Canadian emigrants to the United States
Living people
Male actors from Vancouver
Primetime Emmy Award winners
Canadian television producers
Canadian television directors
Canadian television writers
Writers from Vancouver